La Scala is a village in Tuscany, central Italy, administratively a frazione of the comune of San Miniato, province of Pisa.

La Scala is about 48 km from Pisa and 2 km from San Miniato.

References

Bibliography 
 

Frazioni of the Province of Pisa